The 1985 Duke Blue Devils football team represented the Duke Blue Devils of Duke University during the 1985 NCAA Division I-A football season.

Schedule

References

Duke
Duke Blue Devils football seasons
Duke Blue Devils football